Ronald (Ron) Edward Kraus (born May 13, 1956) is a Minnesota politician and was a member of the Minnesota House of Representatives from 1995 to 1999.  Kraus, a Republican, who represented District 27A, which included all of Freeborn county in the southeastern part of the state.

Early life and family
Born in Waltham, Minnesota to Edward James Kraus (1926-1959) and Vivian Hoffman Krause Zimmerman. His father died when Ron was only 3 years old on July 30, 1959. His mother remarried when Ron was 6 in 1962 to James (Jim) E. Zimmerman (1923-2015), a widower who had lost his wife and 6 kids in a train accident in 1959. Ron has 5 siblings: Joan, James, Steven, Richard, and Thomas Thomas. He has 3 half-siblings: Peter, Paul and Mariia.

Education and career
Kraus attended Mankato State University, Saint Mary's College, and University of Minnesota Duluth where he studied business and political science. In 1981 Kraus founded Kraus Petroleum. He bought his first Dairy Queen in 1988. Kraus changed the name of his business to Kraus Foods. Kraus served as Chair of the Albert Lea/Freeborn County Chamber of Commerce.  Kraus also served on the Albert Lea Planning Commission and the Community Foundation Board. Kraus became a successful business owner running an empire of 41 Dairy Queen restaurants in Minnesota, Iowa, Wisconsin, and Florida and two Convenience Stores called Korner Mart in Albert Lea, Minnesota. In March 2008, Kraus sold 33 of his 41 Dairy Queen restaurants to Bloomington, Minnesota-based Fourteen Foods. Kraus retained ownership of the 8 remaining Dairy Queen's in Florida. In April 2008, Kraus sold his 2 Korner Mart Stores to a long-time employee of Kraus Foods, Kevin Weitzel. Kraus relocated the Headquarters of Kraus Foods from Albert Lea to Fort Myers, Florida.

Minnesota House of Representatives

Elections
Kraus was first elected to the House on November 8, 1994, he was re-elected in 1996. In 1998 he decided not to run for a 3rd term wanting to return to his business.

Committee assignments
For the 80th Legislative Session, Karus was part of the:
Agriculture Committee
Local Government and Metropolitan Affairs Committee
Taxes Committee
Property Tax and Tax Increment Financing Division Subcommittee

For the 79th Legislative Session, Kraus was part of the:
Agriculture 
Agriculture Finance and Rural Development Subcommittee 
Commerce, Tourism and Consumer Affairs 
Real Estate and Commerce Subcommittee
Education 
University of Minnesota Finance Division Subcommittee.

Tenure
Kraus was first sworn in on January 3, 1995, serving until January 4, 1999. He served in the 79th and 80th Minnesota Legislatures. He served all 4 years in the minority caucus. Successful legislation Kraus carried includes a law that requires school superintendent candidates to tell the hiring school board if they had ever been bought out of a previous job contract. He also was able to get $800,000 for the Blazing Star Trail, $250,000 for Albert Lea schools to develop a unique kindergarten and first-grade pilot program, and a $250,000 "Mighty Ducks" grant for a second ice sheet in Albert Lea, Minn. Kraus also worked hard to reduce commercial and industrial property tax rates.

Personal life
Kraus is married to his wife, Kathy. They have 2 kids, Chad(b. 1981) and John(b. 1983). They formerly resided in Albert Lea, Minnesota  At the time of his step-father's death in 2015, Kraus currently resides in Fort Myers, Florida. Kraus, like his step-father was a member of the Knights of Columbus. He attended St. Theodore's Catholic Church in Albert Lea. Kraus was also a member of the Albert Lea Elks Club.

References

External links

Republican Party members of the Minnesota House of Representatives
People from Mower County, Minnesota
Businesspeople from Minnesota
1956 births
Living people
People from Albert Lea, Minnesota
Minnesota State University, Mankato alumni